Cieplak is a Polish language family name. Notable people with the surname include:

 Jan Cieplak (1857–1926) Polish archbishop
 Marian Cieplak (1893–1966), Polish diplomat and statesman
 Paweł Cieplak (born 1966), Polish diplomat
 Ursula Cieplak, a protagonist of a Polish telenovela BrzydUla

Polish-language surnames